Henry Scudder may refer to:

 Henry Austin Scudder (1819-1892), Massachusetts state legislator
 Henry Joel Scudder (1825–1886), U.S. Representative from New York
 Henry Scudder (priest) (died 1659), English Presbyterian
 Henry Martyn Scudder (1822–1895), missionary to Japan and South India